504 Squadron "Linces" (Esquadra 504) is a special transport squadron of the Portuguese Air Force (PoAF). The unit operates the Dassault Falcon 50, and is based at Air Base No. 6, in Montijo, and also operates from the Lisbon Portela Airport.

The squadron is responsible for VIP transport of high level government officials, medical evacuation, urgent transport of human organs for transplant, and verification and calibration of navigational aids.

History 
The squadron was officially formed on January 12, 1985, at Air Base No. 6 (BA6) upon the purchase of three Dassault Falcon 20, from Federal Express in 1984, for the transport of high level officials of the Portuguese government.

Two Dassault Falcon 50 were later acquired in 1989 and one more was purchased in 1991 to reinforce the squadron's aircraft fleet.

Starting from 1990 the squadron was permanently detached to the Transit Airfield No. 1 (AT1) in Lisbon.

Aircraft 
 Dassault Falcon 20DC (1984–2005)
 Dassault Falcon 50 (1989–current)
 Dassault Falcon 900 (2023-current)

See also 
 Air transports of heads of state and government
 Air medical services
 Portuguese Air Force
 List of aircraft of the Portuguese Air Force

References

External links 
 Official website 
 Squadron information page, Portuguese Air Force website 
 History and Mission of 504 Squadron, documentary video produced by the Portuguese Air Force 

Portuguese Air Force aircraft squadrons
Military units and formations established in 1985
1985 establishments in Portugal
Military of Portugal